Montebourg is a commune in the Manche department in Normandy in north-western France.

Geography
Montebourg is located southeast of Cherbourg.

Heraldry

International relations

Montebourg is twinned with:
 Walheim,*, Germany (1960)
 Sturminster Newton, Dorset, England
 Saint Saviour, Guernsey

Main sights 
 Église Saint-Jacques de Montebourg
 Abbaye de Montebourg (List of Benedictine monasteries in France)
 Statue de Jeanne d'Arc de Montebourg

See also
Communes of the Manche department

References

Communes of Manche